Live at the Royal Albert Hall is the second live album released by Scottish pop rock quartet Wet Wet Wet. Released on 17 May 1993, the album is a recording of the band's 3 November 1992 concert at the Royal Albert Hall in London, where they were accompanied on stage by the 100-piece Wren Orchestra. Notably, the concert itself was only announced just days before it was due to take place, with the band having only been asked to perform at the venue three weeks previously. Subsequently, the band were only given three days to rehearse their entire set.

The album was released on CD, Cassette and Vinyl LP, and was preceded by the release of a double A-side live single, containing the tracks "Blue for You" and "This Time", on 26 April 1993. The album peaked at #10 on the UK Albums Chart, with a percentage of profits from every release going towards Nordoff Robbins Music Therapy. The live recording of "Blue for You" was later included on the band's first greatest hits compilation, End of Part One. A VHS video of the concert, containing additional interviews with the band, followed on 24 May 1993.

Tracklisting

Charts

References

Wet Wet Wet albums
Live albums recorded at the Royal Albert Hall
1993 live albums